The Red Line (formerly and internally known as Route 66, also known as the Airport–Windermere Line) is a rapid transit line of the RTA Rapid Transit system in Cleveland, Ohio, running from Cleveland Hopkins International Airport northeast to Tower City in downtown Cleveland, then east and northeast to Windermere.  of track, including two stations (Tri-C–Campus District and East 55th), are shared with the light rail Blue and Green Lines; the stations have high platforms for the Red Line and low platforms for the Blue and Green Lines. The whole Red Line is built next to former freight railroads. It follows former intercity passenger rail as well, using the pre-1930 right-of-way of the New York Central from Brookpark to West 117th, the Nickel Plate from West 98th to West 65th, and the post-1930 NYC right-of-way from West 25th to Windermere. The Red Line uses overhead lines and pantographs to draw power and trains operate using One-man operation.

History 
The corridor along which the Red Line runs had been planned for use since before 1930 when the Cleveland Union Terminal opened. The first short section, between East 34th and East 55th Streets, was in use by the Cleveland Interurban Railroad in 1920, and in 1930 the line between East 34th and the Union Terminal was completed. It was not until March 15, 1955, that the eastern half of the Red Line opened, from the existing line near East 55th northeast next to the New York, Chicago and St. Louis Railroad (Nickel Plate Road) to Windermere. The line from downtown southwest to West 117th Street opened on August 15, 1955. This line ran next to the Nickel Plate to the crossing of the New York Central Railroad near West 101st Street, and then next to the New York Central. On November 15, 1958, an extension to West Park opened, and the final section, continuing to Cleveland Hopkins International Airport, opened in 1968, the first airport rail link in North America.

Schedule and headways 

The Red Line runs from approximately 3:15 a.m. to 1:45 a.m. daily. Trains run approximately every 15 minutes all day everyday.

Rolling stock 

The Red Line uses a fleet of 40 (originally 60) stainless-steel subway-type cars manufactured by Tokyu Car Corporation and delivered to RTA between 1984 and September 1985. The cars have three sets of doors on each side, one in the center and one at each end adjacent to the operator cab. The cars' exteriors originally had orange and red stripes along the sides, but these stripes were removed when RTA changed to a red, white, and blue color scheme. 20 of the cars are operable in single units, and they are numbered 181–200. The other 40 cars are operable in pairs, and they are numbered 301–340.

The current fleet of Red Line cars underwent an in-house rehabilitation under the direction of the former director of rail Michael Couse. The cars were overhauled over the course of five years using federal grant money. Cars received pantographs and controllers, along with rebuilt trucks, traction motors, resistor banks, new flame-retardant flooring, LED lighting, new seat frames, revised interior paneling, and additional open space for improved ADA compliance. The first of the rebuilt cars was unveiled to the public on December 10, 2013.

The current cars represent the third generation of cars that have been used on the line. The line opened using a fleet of shorter cars manufactured by the St. Louis Car Company in 1954 and 1955. They were virtually identical to the cars built by St. Louis Car at the same time for what is now the MBTA's Blue Line. Twelve cars were operable as single units with cabs at each end, and 56 cars operable as pairs. The single units were numbered as 101–112, and the paired units as 201–256. Additional cars in this fleet were purchased in 1958 when the line was extended to West Park. These comprised six additional single unit cars (numbers 113–118) and 14 additional double unit cars (numbers 257–270).

When the extension to Hopkins Airport was being built in 1967, a fleet of 20 longer cars was purchased to supplement and replace the Blue Birds. The cars, which had a stainless steel exterior with red and white trim and featured interior luggage racks, were promoted as "Airporters." The Airporters supplanted the Blue Birds, except during rush hour when extra cars were needed. In 1970, ten additional Airporters were purchased, numbered as 171–180. With the purchase of the Tokyu cars in 1985, all Airporters and Blue Birds were retired.

In April 2019, a study recommended that 34 new cars be procured in 2020 for delivery in 2023, but the subsequent COVID-19 pandemic may have delayed this. During a board meeting in January 2020, a contract was awarded to LTK Consulting to prepare specifications. In September 2020, RTA received $15 million from the federal government for the replacement of both its light (Blue/Green/Waterfront lines) and heavy rail fleet, but the 2019 study suggested it would take $102 million to replace the heavy rail and $96 million to replace the light rail, totaling $198 million. As of the September 2020 post, it was planned a contract would be awarded during the second quarter of 2021, but they have not said anything about it since.

In May 2021, 18 decommissioned cars (combined light rail and heavy rail) were scrapped to make room for the new cars.

Stations 
All stations are ADA  accessible stations.

In popular culture 
The Red Line is prominently featured in the final scenes of the film Proximity, starring Rob Lowe and James Coburn. The finale involves a hostage on a Red Line train and a gunfight and chase scene through the Tower City station.

See also 
Northern Ohio Railway Museum

References

External links 

U.S. Urban Rail Transit Lines Opened From 1980 (PDF)
nycsubway.org – Cleveland, Ohio
Greater Cleveland Regional Transit Authority – Maps and Schedules
Jon Bell – Cleveland, Ohio: Red Line

 
Rapid transit in Ohio
Standard gauge railways in the United States
Cleveland
600 V DC railway electrification
1955 establishments in Ohio
Railway lines opened in 1955